Emilio Bisi (Milan, November 7, 1850 – Milan, February 19, 1920) was an Italian sculptor.

His father was Luigi Bisi, a painter and president of the Brera Academy in Milan from 1880 till his death in 1886. Emilio donated a memorial statue of his father to the Academy. In 1883, Emilio's wife was a writer, Sofia Albini. He worked mostly on commissions for funeral monuments and churches. He completed the Santa Melania for the Duomo of Milan, two tombs for the brothers Maccia in the Monumental Cemetery of Milan, and a monument to Antonio Soneino Gussala, the friend of Pietro Giordani and donor of his manuscripts in the Mauricelliana Library. The latter monument with inscription by the poet Giosuè Carducci. He also completed nine larger than life figures for the facade of the Serbian church of St Spyridon in Trieste. He completed a monument to Covacevich for the Serbian cemetery of Trieste and Monument to Count Carlo Barbiani di Belgioioso, who had served as president of the Milan Academy before his father.

References

External links
 
 

Artists from Milan
Brera Academy alumni
1850 births
1920 deaths
Architectural sculptors
20th-century Italian sculptors
20th-century Italian male artists
19th-century Italian male artists
19th-century Italian sculptors
Italian male sculptors